Sister Smile (original title: Sœur Sourire) is a Belgian-French biographical drama film directed by Stijn Coninx and written by Coninx, Ariane Fert and Chris Vander Stappen. The film stars Cécile de France as Jeannine Deckers, also known as The Singing Nun. The film won the Magritte Award for Best Costume Design.

Plot
Belgium in the 1950s. Jeanine Deckers dreams of becoming a singer and of going to Africa as a missionary. Against her family's wishes, she joins a convent. However, the strict rules become too much for her. She rebels, especially when her guitar is taken from her and when she hears that she'll have to wait several years before being sent to Africa for missionary work. Despite being punished, she is eventually given back her guitar so she can entertain young people visiting the convent. One day she is filmed by Belgian television while singing and playing music to a group of youngsters. This launches her career as a commercially successful artist, yet everything she earns is sent to the convent and the head nuns keep her identity secret from the general public, while keeping her success secret from Deckers herself.

Later, Deckers discovers the truth and eventually gets fed up with obeying the other nuns. She leaves the convent and moves in with her friend Annie who had made a pass at her when they were younger but whom she rejected.

Deckers desperately tries to get her career back on the road but she is told that she cannot use her stage name "Soeur Sourire" or "Singing Nun" because the convent owns the rights to it. She starts performing under her own name and goes on a tour in Québec, but due to her controversial song about birth control nobody wants to sign her anymore for concerts. Deckers is reduced to singing in small strip clubs and gets depressed. Rejected by both the convent and her own family, Deckers returns to Annie and falls in love.

Pursued by the Ministry of Finance of Belgium for taxes on her first album, which the Church didn't pay, she and Annie commit suicide together.

Cast
Cécile de France as Jeanine Deckers (The Singing Nun)
Filip Peeters as Antoine Brusson
Tsilla Chelton as Oldest Dominican
Sandrine Blancke as Annie
Jan Decleir as Lucien Deckers 
Jo Deseure as Gabrielle Deckers
Marie Kremer as Françoise 
Christelle Cornil as Sister Christine 
David Murgia as Louvain
Eric Godon as The bailiff

References

External links
Soeur Sourire at IMDB
Variety 28 April 2009: Soeur Sourire

Films directed by Stijn Coninx
2009 films
2000s French-language films
Biographical films about singers
Films set in Belgium
Films set in the 1950s
Films set in the 1960s
Films set in the 1970s
Films set in the 1980s
Lesbian-related films
Films about Catholic nuns
Films about Catholicism
Films about rebels
Films about suicide
2009 biographical drama films
Belgian biographical drama films
French biographical drama films
Cultural depictions of pop musicians
Cultural depictions of Belgian women
2009 drama films
Biographical films about religious figures
French-language Belgian films
2000s French films